David Alan Siegel (born May 3, 1935) is an American businessman who founded Westgate Resorts Ltd, a Florida-based timeshare resort firm where he serves as president and chief executive officer. He has ten biological children and two adopted children. Siegel is CEO of CFI Resorts Management Inc. and Central Florida Investments Inc. His other businesses include real estate, construction, hotel and apartment management, travel services, insurance, transportation, and retail.

Siegel, his wife Jackie, and their Versailles house, a  residential construction project in Florida, were the subject of the 2012 documentary film The Queen of Versailles.

Siegel was the owner of the Orlando Predators, an arena football team. He also bought the Cocoa Beach Pier and the Las Vegas Hotel.

Personal life
Siegel was born to a wealthy Jewish family in Chicago, to Sadelle and Sid Siegel, a grocer, who moved the family and grocery business to Miami in 1945. Siegel grew up in Florida where he graduated from Miami Senior High School in 1953, and later studied marketing and management at the University of Miami, before dropping out.

In March 1961, Siegel married Geraldine Florence Sanstrom. The couple had three children: Steven, Valerie, and Richard. Their marriage ended in 1968. In 1970, Siegel married Betty Tucker, with whom he had a daughter, Susan, and moved from Miami to Orlando. They divorced in 1997, and he remained the custodial parent of all the children. He met his current wife Jackie Siegel in 1998.  And although she is not Jewish, they were married in a Jewish ceremony. Together, they have eight children, including Jackie's adopted niece, Jonquil. Their other children are: Victoria, David, Daniel, Debbie, Drew, and twins, Jacqueline and Jordan.

Siegel's businesses, family, and personal life were adversely affected by the 2008 financial crisis, as seen in the documentary The Queen of Versailles.
 
On June 6, 2015, the Siegels' 18-year-old daughter Victoria Siegel was found unresponsive at their home in Windermere and, after being taken to hospital, was pronounced dead. The cause of death was later determined to be a drug overdose, which motivated him to advocate against drug abuse.

Politics
Siegel campaigned for George W. Bush in 2000.

In a February 2012 interview with Susan Berfield, Siegel elaborated:
	

During the 2012 United States elections, Siegel caused controversy and public debate when he sent a mass email to his employees, suggesting that they vote for Republican Party candidate Mitt Romney or he might have to take drastic measures in how he operated the company (including cutting back on his company's workforce). In January 2015, it was noted that his company had experienced "the best year in our history" and he raised his company's minimum wage to $10 per hour.

Sexual harassment lawsuit by Dawn Myers
In 2008, Siegel was found liable in a sexual-harassment lawsuit brought by former Westgate employee Dawn Myers. After a trial in the United States District Court for the Middle District of Florida, the jury awarded $5.4 million, but the judge reduced the award to $610,000. In the trial award, Myers recovered $103,622.09 in compensatory damages and $506,847.75 in punitive damages arising from her claim of battery under state law, but her claims of sexual harassment were found to be time-barred. The United States Court of Appeals for the Eleventh Circuit dismissed an appeal and cross-appeal, affirming the district court's judgment.

The Queen of Versailles
The Queen of Versailles is a 2012 American documentary film by Lauren Greenfield. The film shows Jackie Siegel and David Siegel, owners of Westgate Resorts, and their family as they attempt to build the Versailles house, the largest and most expensive single-family house in the United States, and the crisis they face as the U.S. economy declines.

The film also shows Siegel trying and failing to retain ownership of Westgate's Las Vegas high-rise resort, the PH Towers Westgate. Siegel's son and senior Westgate executive, Richard, is quoted as saying that David Siegel's determination not to lose the Ph Tower was a major source of the company's financial troubles in 2009–11. On November 22, 2011, a controlling interest in the property was sold to Resort Finance America LLC.

On January 10, 2012, David Siegel and Westgate Resorts, Ltd filed a lawsuit in Florida against the Sundance Institute and the filmmakers of The Queen of Versailles, claiming that Sundance's published film description was defamatory. On January 23, 2013, the United States District Court Judge Conway of the Middle District of Florida ordered a stay of the lawsuit pending arbitration. In her order, Judge Conway called the testimony previously offered by Siegel during court hearings "inconsistent and incredible and thus lacking weight".

The matter was subsequently heard before an arbitrator for the Independent Film & Television Alliance (IFTA) in June 2013. On March 13, 2014, the arbitrator awarded in favor of the filmmakers, Lauren Greenfield and Frank Evers, including an order that David Siegel and Westgate Resorts pay $750,000 to the filmmakers.

The arbitrator wrote in the award, "Having viewed the supposedly egregious portions of the Motion Picture numerous times, [the Arbitrator] simply does not find that any of the content of the Motion Picture was false." The arbitrator also wrote that Westgate had failed to show how the documentary damaged it. Finally, the arbitrator noted that Westgate "did not remotely establish the type of malice required for a defamation claim on behalf of a public figure."

A second lawsuit filed by David Siegel (and Jackie Siegel) in February 2013 against the filmmakers of The Queen of Versailles was subsequently heard by Greg Derin of the American Arbitration Association in Los Angeles. On February 28, 2014, Derin ruled that the filmmakers' agreement with the family, pertaining to certain life rights, was "invalid and unenforceable". The Siegels' attempt to sue for $5 million in damages was also dismissed by Derin.

Mystery Fun House
Siegel was one of the founders of Mystery Fun House, an attraction in Orlando, Florida, that opened on March 28, 1976, and operated until 2001. It was located near International Drive, on Major Boulevard, across from Universal Orlando Resort. Over time, the fun house expanded to include a laser-tag facility, an arcade, a dinosaur-themed mini golf course, and other attractions. He also produced the movie Night Terror within the MFH in 2002. It starred local talent but also included Jeff Speakman and Al Lewis (The Munsters).

Filmography

References

External links

MFH on BigFloridaCountry – Pictures and Information

1935 births
Living people
American businesspeople in retailing
American chief executives of travel and tourism industry companies
American construction businesspeople
American financiers
American hoteliers
American businesspeople in insurance
20th-century American Jews
American real estate businesspeople
American transportation businesspeople
Businesspeople from Chicago
Businesspeople from Miami
Florida Republicans
Illinois Republicans
People from Windermere, Florida
University of Miami Business School alumni
Siegel family
Miami Senior High School alumni
21st-century American Jews